Poulad Kimiayi (or Poulad Kimiai) (born 14 July 1980) is an Iranian actor and film director.

Background 
Poulad Kimiayi was born in 1980 in Tehran to Masoud Kimiai and Giti Pashaei. He made his film debut at age eight with a minor appearance in his father's film, The Lead on 1988. He later gained fame by Fereydoun Jeyrani's TV series, The Gradual Death of a Dream with a special make-up and a different role.

Filmography

References

External links
 
Poulad Kimiayi at Iranian Movie Database
Poulad Kimiayi at Instagram
Poulad Kimiayi at Twitter
Poulad Kimiayi at Facebook

Iranian male actors
Living people
21st-century Iranian male actors
1980 births
Male actors from Tehran
Iranian film directors
Iranian male film actors
Iranian male stage actors